Ayerfjorden is the western branch of Raudfjorden in Albert I Land at Spitsbergen, Svalbard. The glacier Chauveaubreen debouches into the fjord.

References

Fjords of Spitsbergen